Peter Paul Marcus (December 17, 1917 – April 20, 1997) was an American football end in the National Football League for the Washington Redskins.  He attended the University of Kentucky and Western Kentucky University.

1917 births
1997 deaths
People from Westmoreland County, Pennsylvania
Players of American football from Pennsylvania
American football wide receivers
Kentucky Wildcats football players
Western Kentucky Hilltoppers football players
Washington Redskins players